Contin is a surname which may refer to:

 Alexis Contin (born 1986), French speed skater
 Carlos Raúl Contín (1915–1991), Argentine politician
 Celeste Contín (born 1978), Argentine former tennis player
 Corrado Contin (1922–2001), Italian footballer
 Francesco Contin (1585–1654), Swiss-Italian sculptor and architect
 Leandro Contín (born 1995), Argentine footballer